Lions, Tigers, Bears (and its variations) can mean:

 Lions and Tigers and Bears, the fourth album by rock band The Adventures, released in 1993.
 Lions, Tigers & Bears (song), the fourth single released from American R&B–soul singer Jazmine Sullivan's debut album Fearless.
 Lions, Tigers and Bears (comics), a comic book series from Image Comics and Hermes Press.

See also
"Tigers and Bears", an episode of The Outsider (miniseries)